The Atchison, Topeka and Santa Fe Railway's 1158 class comprised two 2-6-6-2 articulated steam locomotives built in 1910 by the Baldwin Locomotive Works.
They were Jointed Boiler Locomotives, an experiment confined to the Santa Fe; the railroad considered it successful enough to build four of the later 3300 class locomotives with flexible boilers, but both classes were scrapped in the 1920s.

References

2-6-6-2 locomotives
1158
Baldwin locomotives
Mallet locomotives
Steam locomotives of the United States
Railway locomotives introduced in 1910
Scrapped locomotives
Standard gauge locomotives of the United States